St. Euphemia's School and Sisters' House is a historic school building and convent located at Emmitsburg, Frederick County, Maryland.  It is a late-19th century school complex that consists of two attached brick buildings: a two and half story school building built about 1890, and a house that was used as a convent and built about 1860.

It was named after the patron saint of sister Euphemia Blenkinsop in 1899 as a tribute to her memory.
It was listed on the National Register of Historic Places in 1984.

References

External links
, including photo from 2006, at Maryland Historical Trust

School buildings on the National Register of Historic Places in Maryland
Properties of religious function on the National Register of Historic Places in Maryland
Buildings and structures in Frederick County, Maryland
Defunct schools in Maryland
1890s architecture in the United States
National Register of Historic Places in Frederick County, Maryland